This is a list of law enforcement agencies in the state of Indiana.

According to the US Bureau of Justice Statistics' 2008 Census of State and Local Law Enforcement Agencies, the state had 482 law enforcement agencies employing 13,171 sworn police officers, about 206 for each 100,000 residents.

Since 2012, the Indiana Law Enforcement Training Board (ILETB) has instituted a three-tier system of training for the state's various law enforcement agencies.
 Tier I: Full Basic Recruit Academy at one of the state's ILETB certified academies
 Tier II: Eight-week program held at the Indiana Law Enforcement Academy (ILEA) in Plainfield
 Tier III: Four-week program held at the ILEA in Plainfield

Tier I State Agencies 
Indiana Department of Natural Resources Law Enforcement Division
Indiana Law Enforcement Academy
Indiana Office of Inspector General
Indiana State Excise Police
Indiana State Fire Marshal's Office
Indiana State Police
Indiana State Police Capitol Police Section
Indiana State Police Commercial Vehicle Enforcement

Tier II State Agencies 
Indiana Department of Correction
Indiana Gaming Commission Office of Enforcement, Investigation, and Control

Tier III State Agencies 
Indiana Attorney General's Office Medicaid Fraud Unit
Indiana Secretary of State Securities Enforcement Division

Tier I County Sheriff Agencies

Tier I Municipal Police and Tier II Town Marshal Agencies

Tier I College and University Police Agencies 
Anderson University Police Department
Ball State University Police Department
Butler University Police Department
DePauw University Department of Public Safety
Huntington University Police Department
Indiana Purdue Fort Wayne (IPFW) Police Department
Indiana State University Police Department
Indiana University Public Safety
Indiana University Police Department (Bloomington)
Indiana University East Police Department (Richmond)
Indiana University Kokomo Police Department
Indiana University Northwest Police Department (Gary)
Indiana University South Bend Police Department
Indiana University Southeast Police Department (New Albany)
Indiana University–Purdue University Indianapolis Police Department
Indiana Wesleyan University Police Department
Marian University Police Department
Notre Dame University Police Department
Purdue University Police Department
Purdue University Northwest Police Department
Taylor University Police Department
University of Indianapolis Police Department
Valparaiso University Police Department
Vincennes University Police Department

Tier I School Corporation Police Agencies Set Forth Under I.C. 20-26-16 
Brownsburg Community School Corporation Police Department
Carmel-Clay Schools Police Department
Concord Community Schools corporation police department (2017)
Center Grove Community School Corporation Police Department

Evansville Vanderburgh Community School Corporation Police Department
Franklin Township Community School Corporation Police Department
Indiana School for the Deaf Police Department
Lebanon Schools Police Department
Metropolitan School District of Pike Township Police Department
Metropolitan School District of Warren Township Police Department
Metropolitan School District of Wayne Township Police Department
Monroe County Community School Corporation Police Department
Prairie Heights School Corporation Police Department

Tier I Airport, Transit, & Railroad Police Agencies 
Amtrak Police Department
Canadian National Railroad Police Department
CSX Police Department
Fort Wayne International Airport Authority Public Safety Department
Indiana Harbor Belt Railroad Police Department
Indianapolis International Airport Police Department
Louisville and Indiana Railroad Security Department
Norfolk Southern Railroad Police Department
Northern Indiana Commuter Transportation District (NICTD) Police Department
St Joseph County Airport Authority Department of Public Safety
Terre Haute International Airport - Hulman Field Police Department

Tier II Hospital Police Agencies 
Deaconess Hospital Police Department
Ascension St. Vincent Hospital Police Department
Community Hospital Anderson Police Department
Indiana University Health Department of Public Safety - Police
Marion General Hospital Police Department
Memorial Hospital of South Bend Police Department
Parkview Health Hospital Police Department

Fire Departments Employing Tier I or Tier III Arson Investigators 
Evansville Fire Department
Fort Wayne Fire Department
Indianapolis Fire Department
Plainfield Fire Territory

Agencies Employing Special Police or Special Deputies Set Forth Under I.C. 36-8-3-7 & 36-8-10-10.6 
Marion County
Community Health Network Hospital Security
Eagle/Trident Patrol
Eskenazi Hospital Security
Indianapolis-Marion County Forensic Services
Indianapolis Public Schools Police Department
Metropolitan School District of Perry Township Police Department
Metropolitan School District of Washington Township Police Department
Metropolitan School District of Wayne Township Police Department
Pike Township Fire Department
Protection Plus Inc
St Francis Hospital Security
St Vincent Hospital Security
Wayne Township Fire Department

ILETB Certified Training Academies 
Fort Wayne Police Academy in Fort Wayne
Indiana Law Enforcement Academy (ILEA) in Plainfield
Indiana State Police Academy at ILEA in Plainfield
Indiana University Police Academy in Bloomington
Indianapolis Metropolitan Police Academy in Indianapolis
Northwest Indiana Law Enforcement Academy (NILEA) in Hobart
Southwest Indiana Law Enforcement Academy (SWILEA) in Evansville

Agencies Set Forth as "Law Enforcement" Under Definition I.C. 35-31.5-2-185 but Minimum Training Standards Not Governed by the ILETB 
Center Township Constable's Office - Marion County, Indiana
Decatur Township Constable's Office - Marion County, Indiana
Franklin Township Constable's Office - Marion County, Indiana
Lawrence Township Constable's Office - Marion County, Indiana
Perry Township Constable's Office - Marion County, Indiana
Pike Township Constable's Office - Marion County, Indiana
Warren Township Constable's Office - Marion County, Indiana
Washington Township Constable's Office - Marion County, Indiana
Wayne Township Constable's Office - Marion County, Indiana

County Prosecutor Agencies

Disbanded/Defunct Agencies 

Ainsworth Marshal's Office
Alamo Police Department
Amboy Police Department
Ambia Police Department
Atlanta Police Department
Blountsville Police Department
Castleton Police Department
Center Point Police Department
Columbus Park Police Department
Crane Police Department
Crows Nest Police Department
Denve Police Department
Diamond Marshal's Office
Dublin Police Department
Dune Acres Police Department
Edwardsport Police Department
Elnora Police Department
Etna Green Police Department
Eugene Marshal's Office
Evansville Park Police Department
Evansville Regional Airport Police Department
Gary Park Police Department
Grandview Police Department
Hanover University Police Department
Hunertown Police Department
Indiana Department of Conservation
Indiana War Memorial Police Department
Indianapolis Department of Public Safety
Indianapolis Housing Authority Department of Public Safety
Indianapolis Police Department
Iona Police Department
Jefferson Township Constable's Office
Jonesville Police Department
LaPaz Police Department
Lagro Police Department
Laurel Police Department
Leo Police Department
Lewisville Police Department
Mecca Police Department
Mellott Police Department
Miller Marshal's Office
Modoc Police Department
Montgomery Police Department
New Richmond Police Department
New Ross Police Department
Pekin Police Department
Plainville Police Department
Pottawattamie Park Police Department
Ravenswood Police Department
Sandborn Police Department
South Bend Park Police Department
Spiceland Police Department
Spring Lake Police Department 
Town of Pines Police Department
Union Police Department
Union Station Police Department
Wanatha Police Department
Warrenton Police Department
Wingate Police Department

See also 

 Crime in Indiana
 Law enforcement in the United States
 Contracted law enforcement municipalities in Indiana

References

Indiana
 
Indiana-related lists